FEMS Yeast Research  is a peer-reviewed  scientific journal focusing on yeast and yeast-like organisms. The journal was established in 2001. It is published by Oxford University Press on behalf of the Federation of European Microbiological Societies and the editor-in-chief is John Morrissey.

Abstracting and indexing
The journal is indexed and abstracted in the following bibliographic databases:

According to the Journal Citation Reports, the journal has a 2020 impact factor of 2.796, ranking it 19th out of 29 journals in the category "Mycology", 95th out of 159 journals in "Biotechnology & Applied Microbiology", and 91st out of 137 journals in "Microbiology".

References

External links

English-language journals
Microbiology journals
Oxford University Press academic journals
Publications established in 2001
8 times per year journals
Federation of European Microbiological Societies academic journals